Bertha Boronda (née Zettle; March 14, 1877 – January 18, 1950) was an American woman who sliced off her husband's penis in 1907. She was convicted of the crime of mayhem; she used a straight razor to slice off her husband's penis. She fled the scene of the crime, but was captured the next day.  Boronda was tried, convicted and imprisoned at San Quentin Penitentiary.

Crime
The victim was Bertha Boronda's husband, Frank Boronda: Captain of Chemical Engine No. 1 with the San Jose Fire Department. On Friday, May 30, 1907, Bertha insisted that her husband Frank had visited a place of prostitution. Shortly after midnight, she cut her husband's penis off with a razor while in bed. He was able to go to the firehouse, which was adjacent to his home, and received treatment in a hospital.

Capture
She was apprehended while disguised, wearing a man's clothing and mounting a bicycle to make her escape. She was not found by police until more than 24 hours had passed. After her capture, Bertha Boronda admitted her crime and expressed no regret.

The newspaper reports were tactfully non-specific. "'She drew a razor and cut her husband.' Then she walked to her nephew's room and simply stated, 'Frank cut himself.'"

On June 1, Frank Boronda made a complaint to Justice Brown from his hospital bed at the Red Cross Hospital. Mrs. Boronda was accused of mayhem. The felony of mayhem, punishable by up to 14 years in prison, was defined by Section 204 of the criminal code: "Every person who unlawfully and maliciously deprives a human being of a member of his body or renders it useless, or cuts or disables the tongue, nose, ear or lip, is guilty of mayhem."

Bertha Boronda was held on $10,000 bond - $291,819.15 in 2021 dollars.

Trial
Mr. Boronda testified at the trial that he and his wife had visited the San Jose theater, and that the attack was unprovoked.  He claimed that she was amorous and had invited him to her bed before the attack.  The prosecution's theory was that this was a deliberate planned attack in furtherance of a jealous rage.

Defense
Mrs. Boronda had several defenses, chief among them being her complete lack of any recollection of the night in question. She claimed she became enraged at her husband, and the two had an argument because she thought he was going to leave her. She admitted that she maimed him, but expressed no regret. As reported in the Santa Cruz Sentinel, "Her only excuse is that she wanted to be revenged on Boronda, whom she believed intended deserting her and leaving for Mexico."  Another defense was that Mr. Boronda had made "a vile request." 

At the trial she settled on a defense of "Emotional insanity" from extreme jealousy. She took the stand in her defense and explained why she dressed like a man when she fled after the incident. She stated that her husband had been gone for two weeks; and she often wore her brother's clothing when she spied on her husband.

Sentence
The jury deliberated two hours before convicting her. Bertha Boronda was sentenced to five years in prison, but served only two and was released from prison on December 20, 1909.

Personal life
Bertha Zettle was born in 1877 to German immigrants in Minnesota. She married Frank Boronda (born Mario Narcisso Boronda in 1863) in 1901. He was a Mexican American captain with the San Jose Fire Department.

In the aftermath of the incident, Bertha and Frank Boronda divorced. Both Frank and Bertha later remarried. Bertha married Alexander Patterson in 1921, however the two eventually divorced.

Her remains are interred at Calvary Catholic Cemetery in San Jose, California.

See also
 Lorena Bobbitt
 Brigitte Harris case
 Catherine Kieu
 Emasculation
 Francine Hughes and The Burning Bed
 Genital modification and mutilation
 Law and Order, Season 4, Episode 17 "Mayhem"
 Lin and Xie case
 Penectomy
 Penis removal
 Penis transplantation
 Sada Abe
 Carlos Castro (journalist)

Notes

References

External links
 
 Bertha Boronda at Find a Grave

1877 births
1950 deaths
Amputations
Criminals from Minnesota
Intimate partner violence
Domestic violence in the United States
Incidents of domestic violence
Incidents of violence against men
Offences against the person
People from San Jose, California
Violence against men in North America
20th-century criminals
American people of German descent